"That's What Friends Are For" is a single by UK band Modern Romance. It was released in 1984 as a 7-inch single and 12-inch single by RCA Records and was produced by Tony Visconti. It is taken from their studio album Burn It! (1984) as is the B-side, "(Blame My) Jealousy".

Formats
7-inch single
"That's What Friends Are For"
"That's What Friends Are For" [re-mix]

12-inch single
"That's What Friends Are For" [U.S. Mix]
"That's What Friends Are For" [Dub Mix]
"(Blame My) Jealousy"

Personnel
Michael J. Mullins - vocals
David Jaymes - bass guitar
Robbie Jaymes - synthesizer
Paul Gendler - guitar
Andy Kyriacou - drums
Tony Visconti - Producer (music)

References

1984 singles
Modern Romance (band) songs
Song recordings produced by Tony Visconti
1984 songs
RCA Records singles
Songs written by David Jaymes
Songs written by Michael J. Mullins